Örvényes is a village at lake Balaton, in Veszprém county, Hungary.

External links 
 Street map (Hungarian)

References 

Populated places in Veszprém County